Sea Life Grapevine is an interactive aquarium located at Grapevine Mills in Grapevine, Texas. The aquarium contains thousands of aquatic creatures, plus interactive touch pools and a 360° ocean tunnel. Sea Life Grapevine is owned and operated by Merlin Entertainments.

Main species

Protection of turtles
A fundraising campaign run by Sea Life has enabled a new Sea Turtle Rescue and Wildlife Information Centre to be built on the Greek island of Zakynthos to treat turtles who have been injured in collisions with pleasure craft or entanglement in fishing gear.

References

Aquaria in Texas
Sea Life Centres
Grapevine, Texas
Buildings and structures in Tarrant County, Texas
Tourist attractions in Tarrant County, Texas